Into the Unknown is the second studio album by Bad Religion, which was released on November 30, 1983. The album marks a distinct departure from the band's previous album; instead of featuring hardcore punk, the album is characterized by slower tempos, use of electronic organ and pianos, and a prog-influenced hard rock sound. Into the Unknown is the only Bad Religion album to feature Paul Dedona on bass and Davy Goldman on drums. Dedona was ejected from the band before their next recording and replaced by Tim Gallegos, while former drummer Pete Finestone returned to the band in 1986. The album also features Bad Religion's longest track to date, "Time and Disregard", which is seven minutes long.

Into the Unknown proved to be the band's most controversial release; despite favorable reviews from music critics, it was a commercial failure, and was characterized as a "misstep" by guitarist Brett Gurewitz. It was not reissued on any format until 2010, when it was issued on vinyl as part of the box set 30 Years of Bad Religion, and has never been reissued on its own.

Production
Gurewitz commented on the album's production on the official Bad Religion website, stating that the album was quickly produced after the release of the band's debut, How Could Hell Be Any Worse?, because the band did not take themselves seriously and didn't think it would last very long, despite the success of their debut and popularity on the underground music scene. Gurewitz said that "not much thought" was put into the album's production. Drummer Pete Finestone and bass player Jay Bentley quit the band as the result of the change in musical style. Bad Religion hired producer Thom Wilson to collaborate with the band during the album's production.

Musical style and influences
Gurewitz and the other band members were very much into progressive rock before getting into punk rock, and wanted to record an album reflecting a prog and avant-garde influence. The album is characterized by slower tempos and use of electronic organ and piano-driven melody.

Reception

Because of the band's success, they produced more copies of this album than they had of their debut. Gurewitz joked about having "[sent out] ten thousand copies and [getting] eleven thousand back."

In a positive review of the album, The Village Voice critic Robert Christgau said, "I find myself moved by its anthemic ambition--and achievement." John Dougan of AllMusic says that Into the Unknown is "a bit off-putting at first blush, mainly because the tempos are slower and more deliberate, and because of the use of swirling organs and pianos", while he calls it a "terrific record that was perhaps more daring than anyone realized at the time of its release."

Legacy
Into the Unknown is Bad Religion's most controversial release. The band broke up after the album's release, but reformed in 1985. Gurewitz characterized the album as a "terrible misstep". Although Into the Unknown has never been officially released on CD, bootleg CDs of the album exist.

Greg Graffin recalls that the band only performed material from this album once when it was released; when Bad Religion premiered the material live, only 12 people turned out for the concert because fans learned that the band was going to bring keyboards on stage. The band then decided not to bring keyboards on tour with them and return to their hardcore punk sound. In October 2010, the band performed "Billy Gnosis", the first time in 27 years that Bad Religion had performed any songs from the album in concert. In December, the band released the vinyl box set 30 Years of Bad Religion, which reissued all 15 of the band's LPs, including Into the Unknown. The band's website offers commentaries from Greg Graffin and Brett Gurewitz. "The Dichotomy" was repeatedly played live in 2019.

Only four songs have been played live off this album: "It's Only Over When...", "Billy Gnosis", "The Dichotomy" and "...You Give Up".

Track listing

Personnel
 Greg Graffin - lead vocals; keyboards (tracks 1, 2), synthesizer (track 3–5, 7, 8), piano (track 3, 4, 6, 8), acoustic guitar (track 4, 6), backing vocals (tracks 1, 3, 4), production
 Brett Gurewitz - electric guitars; acoustic guitar (track 2), backing vocals (track 2), production
 Paul Dedona - bass guitar
 Davy Goldman - drums; wood block (track 2)
 Jim Mankey - engineering

References

Bad Religion albums
1983 albums
Epitaph Records albums
Hard rock albums by American artists
Progressive rock albums by American artists